Laevilitorina antarctica is a species of sea snail, a marine gastropod mollusk in the family Littorinidae, the winkles or periwinkles.

Description

Distribution

South Pacific Ocean, Antarctic ocean.

References

Littorinidae
Gastropods described in 1902